Luther Rice (25 March 1783 – 27 September 1836) was an American Baptist minister who, after a thwarted mission to India, returned to America where he spent the remainder of his career raising funds for missions and advocating for the formation of a unified Baptist missionary-sending body, which culminated in establishment of the Baptist Triennial Convention (which later split with the formation of the Southern Baptist Convention).  He also raised funds to establish The Columbian College (now The George Washington University) in Washington, DC.

Biography
 

Luther Rice was born March 25, 1783 in Northborough, Massachusetts to Amos Rice and Sarah (Graves) Rice. As a young man at Williams College he became part of a group of young ministers and aspiring missionaries who called themselves "the Brethren." (The group became famous for the "Haystack Prayer Meeting," although Rice was not present that day.) He sailed to Calcutta, India in February 1812 with Adoniram Judson as a Congregationalist missionary and met with English Baptist missionary William Carey. However, after both Rice and Judson became Baptists; Rice returned to America to break ties with the Congregationalists and to raise support for Judson's work from the Baptists. Rice worked to unite Baptists in America to support foreign missionaries which resulted in the organization of "The General Missionary Convention of the Baptist Denomination in United States of America, for Foreign Missions," (also called "the Triennial Convention") in 1814. Also in 1814, Rice was awarded an honorary doctorate by then Baptist-dominated Brown University in partial recognition for his contributions to missionary work undertaken through his Baptist denomination. He spent the rest of his life garnering support for missionaries and Baptist work, traveling across America by horseback to raise funds and awareness for Baptist missions.

Rice also founded Columbian College in 1821, the original unit of The George Washington University (GW) in Washington, D.C. He served as the treasurer of Columbian College from 1826 until his death, September 25, 1836 in Saluda, South Carolina while traveling through the Southern United States raising funds for the missions and seminaries that he founded. He was interred at Pine Pleasant Cemetery, Saluda County, South Carolina.

Although his life was not without controversy, Rice's contribution to the support of missionary work was invaluable in the early years of the Triennial Convention. During Rice's lifetime, the Triennial Convention's membership grew from 8,000 to 600,000, and the convention supported 25 missions and 112 missionaries. By the time of his death, 15 Baptist universities and colleges had been formed. Luther Rice College & Seminary founded in 1962 and located in Lithonia, Georgia, USA, was named after Luther Rice in recognition of his work in the Baptist missions and seminary education.

Genealogy

Luther Rice was a direct descendant of Edmund Rice, an English immigrant to Massachusetts Bay Colony, as follows:

 Luther Rice, son of
 Amos Rice (1743 – 1827), son of
 Jacob Rice (1707 – 1788), son of
 Jacob Rice (1660 – 1746), son of
 Edward Rice (1622 – 1712), son of
 Edmund Rice (1594 – 1663)

Notes

External links
Furman University's Special Collection on Baptists
Baptist Identity and Christian Higher Education, monograph by Donald D. Schmeltekopf and Dianna M. Vitanza
Guide to the Luther Rice Papers, 1812-1832, Special Collections Research Center, Estelle and Melvin Gelman Library, The George Washington University

1783 births
1836 deaths
People from Northborough, Massachusetts
Baptist missionaries in India
Baptist missionaries from the United States
George Washington University faculty
Williams College alumni
University and college founders
19th-century Baptist ministers from the United States
George Washington University trustees
American expatriates in India